Butania is a genus of Asian grasshoppers in the family Chorotypidae.

Species
, species include:
Butania lugubris (Brunner von Wattenwyl, 1898)
Butania metallica Ingrisch, 1987

References

Chorotypidae
Caelifera genera
Orthoptera of Asia